A. giganteum may refer to:
 Allium giganteum, the giant onion, a perennial edible medicinal plant species
 Arsinoitherium giganteum, an extinct mammal species that lived in Ethiopia 27 million years ago

See also
 Giganteum